David Rikl (born 27 February 1971) is a former professional tennis player from the Czech Republic. His success came mostly in doubles, winning 30 titles and finishing runner-up at the 2004 US Open and 2001 Wimbledon Championships Doubles events. He also achieved a singles ranking of world No. 41 in May 1994.

Tennis career

Juniors
As a junior Rikl excelled at doubles, reaching the semi-finals of the French Open and Australian Open and the final of Wimbledon.

Junior Grand Slam results – Singles:

Australian Open: 3R (1989)
French Open: 2R (1989)
Wimbledon: 2R (1989)
US Open: 1R (1988)

Junior Grand Slam results – Doubles:

Australian Open: SF (1989)
French Open: SF (1984)
Wimbledon: F (1983)
US Open: 1R (1988)

Pro tour
Rikl turned professional in 1989.

In singles, he won five Challenger tournaments and achieved his greatest slam performance in 1997, reaching the third round of Wimbledon.

Rikl retired from the professional tour in 2005 and currently resides in London.

Partnership with Jiří Novák
Rikl won most of his titles in the early 2000s and late 1990s with compatriot Jiří Novák. He and Novák made a run to the 2001 Wimbledon Championships finals, losing to Donald Johnson and Jared Palmer in four sets. Rikl won 14 of his titles with Novák, the pair winning 9 of Rikl's titles consecutively.

Last years 
David's son Patrik also plays tennis.

Grand Slam finals

Doubles (2 runner-ups)

Career finals

Doubles (30 titles, 22 runner-ups)

Doubles performance timeline

References

External links 
 
 
 

1971 births
Living people
Czech male tennis players
Czechoslovak male tennis players
Tennis players at the 2000 Summer Olympics
Olympic tennis players of the Czech Republic
People from Brandýs nad Labem-Stará Boleslav
Sportspeople from the Central Bohemian Region